HMS L12 was a L-class submarine built for the Royal Navy during World War I. She was one of five boats in the class to be fitted as a minelayer. The boat survived the war and was sold for scrap in 1932.

Design and description
L9 and its successors were enlarged to accommodate 21-inch (53.3 cm) torpedoes and more fuel. They displaced  on the surface and  submerged. The L-class submarines had a crew of 38 officers and ratings.

For surface running, the boats were powered by two 12-cylinder Vickers  diesel engines, each driving one propeller shaft. When submerged each propeller was driven by a  electric motor. They could reach  on the surface and  underwater.

The boats were armed with four 21-inch torpedo tubes in the bow and two 18-inch (45 cm) in broadside mounts. They carried four reload torpedoes for the 21-inch tubes for a grand total of ten torpedoes of all sizes. They were also armed with a  deck gun. L12 was fitted with 16 vertical mine chutes in her saddle tanks and carried one mine per chute.

Construction and career
HMS L12 was built by Vickers, Barrow-in-Furness. She was laid down on 22 January 1917 and was commissioned on 30 June 1918. She was able to surface and returned to Milford Haven; three sailors died. HMS L12 was sold to John Cashmore Ltd on 16 February 1932 for scrapping at Newport.

Notes

References
 
 
 
 

 

British L-class submarines
Ships built in Barrow-in-Furness
1918 ships
World War I submarines of the United Kingdom
Royal Navy ship names
Maritime incidents in 1929